Gilbert Lefebvre (March 10, 1910 – May 7, 1987) was an American football player. He played professional football for the Cincinnati Reds from 1933 to 1934.  In December 1933, he set an NFL record with a 98-yard punt return that was not broken until 1994.  In 1935, he appeared in one game for the 1935 Detroit Lions team that won the 1935 NFL Championship Game.  He later played with the Los Angeles Bulldogs, Hollywood Braves and Hollywood Stars in Pacific Coast football competition.

References

External links

1910 births
1987 deaths
Detroit Lions players
Cincinnati Reds (NFL) players
People from Douglas, Arizona
Players of American football from Arizona